Ruhr.2010 – Kulturhauptstadt Europas was the name of the campaign in Germany's Ruhr region that earned it recognition as a European Capital of Culture in 2010. This was the first time a region was considered, as Essen represented all 53 towns in the region in the application. Other cultural capitals were in the same year the Hungarian Pécs (Pécs2010) and Istanbul in Turkey, where similar campaigns were held.

Participating cities
The Ruhr.2010 campaign included the participation of all cities in the Ruhr area. Apart from Essen, which presented itself all year long, each of the other cities had one week to themselves in 2010, in which they became the reigning "Local Hero". The participating towns and cities were:

Alpen, Bergkamen, Bochum, Bönen, Bottrop, Breckerfeld, Castrop-Rauxel, Datteln, Dinslaken, Dorsten, Dortmund, Duisburg, Ennepetal, Erkenschwick, Essen, Fröndenberg, Gelsenkirchen, Gevelsberg, Gladbeck, Hagen, Haltern am See, Hamm, Hattingen, Heiligenhaus, Herdecke, Herne, Herten, Holzwickede, Hünxe, Kamen, Kamp-Lintfort, Lünen, Marl, Moers, Mülheim an der Ruhr, Neukirchen-Vluyn, Oberhausen, Recklinghausen, Rheinberg, Schermbeck, Schwelm, Schwerte, Selm, Sonsbeck, Sprockhövel, Unna, Voerde, Waltrop, Werne, Wesel, Wetter, Witten, Xanten

Team
The campaign team consisted of well-known personalities in the arts and political world:

 Administrative directors of the Ruhr.2010 GmbH:
 Fritz Pleitgen: First administrative director
 Oliver Scheytt: Administrative director
 Artistic directors:
 Karl-Heinz Petzinka: director for the theme "City of possibilities"
 Steven Sloane: director of "City of the Arts"
 Aslı Sevindim: director of "City of Cultures"
 Dieter Gorny: director "City of Creativity"

Literature 

 Wolfgang Sykorra: Borbecker Halblang. Ein Schulprojekt der Kulturhauptstadt Europas Ruhr.2010. Essen: Edition Rainruhr 2011. 
 RUHR.2010 GmbH (Hrsg.): Kulturhauptstadt Europas RUHR.2010: Buch zwei. Klartext Verlag, 2010, 
 Achim Nöllenheidt: RuhrKompakt: Der Kulturhauptstadt-Erlebnisführer. Klartext Verlag, 2009, 
Gudrun Norbisrath, Achim Nöllenheidt: Kultur an der Ruhr. Entdeckungsreise in die Kulturhauptstadt. Klartext, Essen 2010, 
 Regionalverband Ruhr (Hrsg.): Unter freiem Himmel / Under the Open Sky. Birkhäuser Verlag, 2010, 
 Regionalverband Ruhr (Hrsg.): Feldstudien/ Field studies. Birkhäuser Verlag, 2010, 
 Gregor Gumpert, Ewald Tucai (Hrsg.): Ruhr.Buch: das Ruhrgebiet literarisch. Dt. Taschenbuch-Verl., 2009,

External links 
 Official website (English)

Ruhr
2010 in Germany
21st century in North Rhine-Westphalia
Cultural policies of the European Union